Oakwood Township may refer to the following townships in the United States:

 Oakwood Township, Vermilion County, Illinois
 Oakwood Township, Wabasha County, Minnesota